Dodia transbaikalensis is a moth of the family Erebidae. It was described by Yuri A. Tshistjakov in 1988. It is found in Siberia and Transbaikalia in Russia.

References

Callimorphina
Moths described in 1988